Qinghai Normal University is a university in Xining, Qinghai, China. Founded in 1956, it lies on the Huangshui River and has 2 colleges, 14 departments, 3 branches and a research institute.

References
Official site

 
Teachers colleges in China
Universities and colleges in Qinghai
Xining
Educational institutions established in 1956
1956 establishments in China